Charles Duits (1925–1991) was a French writer of the fantastique.

Overview
Duits was a friend of André Breton and the surrealists.  He wrote poetry and experimented with peyote. Thousand and One Nights and the Indian Ramayana both influenced his work.

As a novelist, Duits, bears comparison with Gustave Flaubert and with fellow French fantasist Christia Sylf.  Ptah Hotep (1971) and Nefer (1978) together comprise a heroic fantasy take place in an Earth with two moons, one called Athenade and the other Thana. The novels take place during the time of Ancient Egypt and the Roman Empire.  Ptah Hotep is the story of the ascension of a young prince to the rank of the second man of the empire, the duke of Ham. Nefer, which takes place several centuries later, tells of the adventures of a young Egyptian priest who falls in love with a sacred prostitute.

The supernatural, as featured discretely in the novels, reflects Duits spiritual "otherworld". The erotic passages contained within are integrally linked to his mysticism.

Bibliography

 Le Pays de l’Éclairement (The Land of Illumination) (1967)
English translation : "Peyote Dreams (Journeys in the Land of Illumination)" InnerTradition, 2013
https://www.amazon.fr/Peyote-Dreams-CHARLES-DUITS/dp/1594774498
 Ptah Hotep (1971)
 Les Miférables (The Miferables) (1971)
 La Conscience Démonique (Demonic Consciousness) (1974)
 Nefer (1978)
 Fruit sortant de l’Abîme (Fruit From The Abyss) (1993)

External links

 The Visionary Art of Charles Duits : https://picpanzee.com/charlesduits_paintings 

French fantasy writers
1991 deaths
1925 births
20th-century French novelists
French male novelists
20th-century French male writers